Márcia Narloch (born 28 March 1969 in Joinville) is a female marathon runner from Brazil, who won the gold medal in the women's marathon at the 2003 Pan American Games. She represented her native country in four consecutive Summer Olympics, starting in 1992 (Barcelona, Spain).

References
 Profile

1969 births
Living people
Brazilian female long-distance runners
People from Joinville
Athletes (track and field) at the 1992 Summer Olympics
Athletes (track and field) at the 1996 Summer Olympics
Athletes (track and field) at the 2000 Summer Olympics
Athletes (track and field) at the 2004 Summer Olympics
Athletes (track and field) at the 1999 Pan American Games
Athletes (track and field) at the 2003 Pan American Games
Athletes (track and field) at the 2007 Pan American Games
Olympic athletes of Brazil
Brazilian people of German descent
Pan American Games athletes for Brazil
Pan American Games gold medalists for Brazil
Pan American Games silver medalists for Brazil
Pan American Games medalists in athletics (track and field)
Medalists at the 2003 Pan American Games
Medalists at the 2007 Pan American Games
Sportspeople from Santa Catarina (state)
21st-century Brazilian women
20th-century Brazilian women